The 19th Infantry Division (19-ya Pekhotnaya Diviziya) was an infantry formation of the Russian Imperial Army.

Organization
1st Brigade
73rd Infantry Regiment
74th Infantry Regiment
2nd Brigade
75th Infantry Regiment
76th Infantry Regiment
19th Artillery Brigade

Commanders
March 30, 1834 - 12/06/1837 - Lieutenant General Frolov, Pyotr Nikolaevich
06.12.1837 - 09.02.1842 - Major General (from 03.04.1838 Lieutenant General) Fezi, Karp Karpovich
09.02.1842 - 02.12.1844 - Major General (from 11.04.1843 Lieutenant General) Baron Rennenkampf, Pavel Yakovlevich
January 1, 1845 - January 17, 1845 - Major General Labyntsev, Ivan Mikhailovich
January 17, 1845 - 10/23/1845 - Lieutenant General Klucky-von-Klugenau, Franz Karlovich
23.10.1845 - 26.04.1848 - Lieutenant General Labyntsev, Ivan Mikhailovich
04/26/1848 - 11/26/1848 - Commander Major General Poltinin, Mikhail Petrovich
11/26/1848 - 07/02/1849 - Lieutenant General Schwartz, Grigory Efimovich
07/02/1849 - 12/06/1851 - Lieutenant General Schilling, Yakov Vasilievich
06.12.1851 - 23.03.1858 - Lieutenant General Kozlovsky, Vikenty Mikhailovich
03/23/1858 - 07/12/1858 - Lieutenant General Phillipson, Grigory Ivanovich
06.01.1865 - 27.10.1876 - Lieutenant General Svoev, Vladimir Nikitich
хх.хх.1877 - xx.03.1881 - Major General (from 12/29/1877 Lieutenant General) Komarov, Dmitry Vissarionovich
before 01.05.1881 - after 01.06.1882 - Major General Erkert, Georgy Gansovich
09/02/1882 - 12/22/1887 - Major General (from 05/15/1883 Lieutenant General) Dudinsky, Mikhail Fedorovich
12/22/1887 - 06/16/1897 - Lieutenant General Lomakin, Nikolai Pavlovich
06/23/1897 - 10/11/1900 - Major General (from 06/12/1898 Lieutenant General) Hoven, Nikolai Egorovich
04.12.1900 - 05.04.1905 - Major General (from 06.12.1900 Lieutenant General) Maryanov, Nikolai Fedorovich
07/12, 1906 - February 24, 1909 - Lieutenant General Fedorov, Pyotr Petrovich
March 17, 1909 - September 27, 1914 - Lieutenant General Alexander Ragoza
September 27, 1914 - 07/29/1915 - Major General (from 10/13/1914 Lieutenant General) Yanushevsky, Grigory Efimovich
08/25/1915 - 04/12/1917 - Lieutenant General Nechvolodov, Alexander Dmitrievich
04/12/1917 - 07/22/1917 - Major General Cherkasov, Pyotr Vladimirovich
xx.12.1917 - xx.02.1918 - Krapiviansky, Nikolai Grigorievich

References

Infantry divisions of the Russian Empire
Military units and formations disestablished in 1918